Dear Jane is the second EP by Chinese singer Jane Zhang, released on December 8, 2007 by Huayi Brothers.

Track listing 
 Dear Jane (3:39)
 After I Leave (4:40)
 Fortress Besieged (4:20)

References 

2007 EPs
Jane Zhang albums
Mandopop EPs